Alberta Provincial Highway No. 37 is a highway in the province of Alberta, Canada. It runs in an east–west direction just north of St. Albert and Edmonton, from west of Onoway to west of Fort Saskatchewan.

It continues for most of its length on Township Road 550, a correction line, except for avoiding the Sturgeon River and crossing it twice.

North of Edmonton, from Range Road 241 (50 Street NW) to Range Road 232 (33 Street NE), it is given the designation 259 Avenue. However, it does not enter city limits, as the city's boundary is on the south side of the right of way. Highway 37 ends northeast of Edmonton just short of Fort Saskatchewan when it intersects with Highway 15.

Major intersections 
Starting at the west end of Highway 37:

References 

037
Roads in Edmonton